Toni Junnila (born 31 December 1984) is a Finnish footballer currently playing for FC Jazz in the Finnish second tier Ykkönen.

Junnila has previously played 121 matches in the Finnish premier division Veikkausliiga for FC Jazz, Tampere United and FF Jaro. He was a member of the Finland squad at the 2001 European U-16 Championship.

References 

1984 births
Sportspeople from Pori
Finnish footballers
Veikkausliiga players
FC Jazz players
Tampere United players
FC Hämeenlinna players
FF Jaro players
Porin Palloilijat players
Living people
Jakobstads BK players
Association football midfielders
Musan Salama players